Holmium is a chemical element with the symbol Ho and atomic number 67. It is a rare-earth element and the eleventh member of the lanthanide series. It is a relatively soft, silvery, fairly corrosion-resistant and malleable metal. Like a lot of other lanthanides, holmium is too reactive to be found in native form, as pure holmium slowly forms a yellowish oxide coating when exposed to air. When isolated, holmium is relatively stable in dry air at room temperature. However, it reacts with water and corrodes readily, and also burns in air when heated.

In nature, holmium occurs together with the other rare-earth metals (like thulium). It is a relatively rare lanthanide, making up 1.4 parts per million of the Earth's crust, an abundance similar to tungsten. Holmium was discovered through isolation by Swedish chemist Per Theodor Cleve and independently by Jacques-Louis Soret and Marc Delafontaine, who observed it spectroscopically in 1878. Its oxide was first isolated from rare-earth ores by Cleve in 1878. The element's name comes from Holmia, the Latin name for the city of Stockholm.

Like many other lanthanides, holmium is found in the minerals monazite and gadolinite and is usually commercially extracted from monazite using ion-exchange techniques. Its compounds in nature and in nearly all of its laboratory chemistry are trivalently oxidized, containing Ho(III) ions. Trivalent holmium ions have fluorescent properties similar to many other rare-earth ions (while yielding their own set of unique emission light lines), and thus are used in the same way as some other rare earths in certain laser and glass-colorant applications.

Holmium has the highest magnetic permeability and magnetic saturation of any element and is thus used for the pole pieces of the strongest static magnets. Because holmium strongly absorbs neutrons, it is also used as a burnable poison in nuclear reactors.

Characteristics

Physical properties

Holmium is the eleventh member of the lanthanide series. In the periodic table, it appears between the lanthanides dysprosium to its left and erbium to its right, and above the actinide einsteinium. It is a relatively soft and malleable element that is fairly corrosion-resistant and stable in dry air at standard temperature and pressure. In moist air and at higher temperatures, however, it quickly oxidizes, forming a yellowish oxide. In pure form, holmium possesses a metallic, bright silvery luster. With a boiling point of 2727 °C, Holmium is the sixth most volatile lanthanide after ytterbium, europium, samarium, thulium and dysprosium. At ambient conditions, Holmium, like many of the second half of the lanthanides, normally assumes a hexagonally close-packed (hcp) structure. Its 67 electrons are arranged in the configuration [Xe] 4f11 6s2, so that it has thirteen valence electrons filling the 4f and 6s subshells.

Holmium, like all of the lanthanides (except lanthanum, ytterbium and lutetium, which have no unpaired 4f electrons), is paramagnetic in ambient conditions, but is ferromagnetic at temperatures below . It has the highest magnetic moment of any naturally occurring element and possesses other unusual magnetic properties. When combined with yttrium, it forms highly magnetic compounds.

Chemical properties

Holmium metal tarnishes slowly in air, forming a yellowish oxide layer like iron rust. It burns readily to form holmium(III) oxide:

4 Ho + 3 O2 → 2 Ho2O3

Holmium is quite electropositive and is generally trivalent. It reacts slowly with cold water and quite quickly with hot water to form holmium(III) hydroxide:
2 Ho (s) + 6 H2O (l) → 2 Ho(OH)3 (aq) + 3 H2 (g)

Holmium metal reacts with all the stable halogens:
2 Ho (s) + 3 F2 (g) → 2 HoF3 (s) [pink]

2 Ho (s) + 3 Cl2 (g) → 2 HoCl3 (s) [yellow]

2 Ho (s) + 3 Br2 (g) → 2 HoBr3 (s) [yellow]

2 Ho (s) + 3 I2 (g) → 2 HoI3 (s) [yellow]

Holmium dissolves readily in dilute sulfuric acid to form solutions containing the yellow Ho(III) ions, which exist as a [Ho(OH2)9]3+ complexes:

2 Ho (s) + 3 H2SO4 (aq) → 2 Ho3+ (aq) + 3  (aq) + 3 H2 (g)

Oxidation states
As with many lanthanides, holmium is usually found in the +3 oxidation state, forming compounds such as Holmium(III) fluoride (HoF3) and Holmium(III) chloride (HoCl3).  Holmium in solution is in the form of Ho3+ surrounded by nine molecules of water. Holmium dissolves in acids. However, holmium is found to also exist in the +2, +1 and 0 oxidation states.

Isotopes

The isotopes of holmium range from 140Ho to 175Ho. The primary decay mode before the most abundant stable isotope, 165Ho, is positron emission, and the primary mode after is beta minus decay. The primary decay products before 165Ho are terbium and dysprosium isotopes, and the primary products after are erbium isotopes.

Natural holmium consists of one primordial isotope, holmium-165; it is the only isotope of holmium that is thought to be stable, although it is predicted to undergo alpha decay to terbium-161 with a very long half-life. 35 synthetic radioactive isotopes are known; the most stable one is holmium-163 (163Ho), with a half-life of 4570 years. All other radioisotopes have ground-state half-lives not greater than 1.117 days, with the longest, holmium-166 (166Ho) having a half-life of 26.83 hours, and most have half-lives under 3 hours. However, the metastable 166m1Ho has a half-life of around 1200 years because of its high spin. This fact, combined with a high excitation energy resulting in a particularly rich spectrum of decay gamma rays produced when the metastable state de-excites, makes this isotope useful in nuclear physics experiments as a means for calibrating energy responses and intrinsic efficiencies of gamma ray spectrometers.

Compounds

Oxides and chalcogenides 

Holmium(III) oxide is the only oxide of holmium. It changes its apparent color depending on the lighting conditions. In daylight, it has a tannish yellow color. Under trichromatic light, it appears orange red, almost indistinguishable from the appearance of erbium oxide under the same lighting conditions. The perceived color change is related to the sharp emission lines of trivalent holmium ions acting as red phosphors.

Other chalcogenides are known for holmium. Holmium(III) sulfide has orange-yellow crystals in the monoclinic crystal system, with the space group  P21/m (No. 11). Under high pressure, holmium(III) sulfide can form in the cubic and orthorhombic crystal systems. It can be obtained by the reaction of holmium(III) oxide and hydrogen sulfide at 1325 °C. Holmium(III) selenide is also known. It is antiferromagnetic below 6 K.

Halides 

All four trihalides of holmium are known. Holmium(III) fluoride is a yellowish powder that can be produced by reacting holmium(III) oxide and ammonium fluoride, then crystallising it from the ammonium salt formed in solution. Holmium(III) chloride can be prepared in a similar way, with ammonium chloride instead of ammonium fluoride. It has the YCl3 layer structure in the solid state. These compounds, as well as holmium(III) bromide and holmium(III) iodide, can be obtained by the direct reaction of the elements:

2 Ho + 3 X2 → 2 HoX3

In addition, holmium(III) iodide can be obtained by the direct reaction of holmium and mercury(II) iodide, then removing the mercury by distillation.

Organoholmium compounds

Organoholmium compounds are very similar to those of the other lanthanides, as they all share an inability to undergo π backbonding. They are thus mostly restricted to the mostly ionic cyclopentadienides (isostructural with those of lanthanum) and the σ-bonded simple alkyls and aryls, some of which may be polymeric.

History

Holmium (Holmia, Latin name for Stockholm) was discovered by Jacques-Louis Soret and Marc Delafontaine in 1878 who noticed the aberrant spectrographic absorption bands of the then-unknown element (they called it "Element X").

As well, Per Teodor Cleve independently discovered the element while he was working on erbia earth (erbium oxide), and was the first to isolate it.
Using the method developed by Carl Gustaf Mosander, Cleve first removed all of the known contaminants from erbia. The result of that effort was two new materials, one brown and one green. He named the brown substance holmia (after the Latin name for Cleve's home town, Stockholm) and the green one thulia. Holmia was later found to be the holmium oxide, and thulia was thulium oxide.

In Henry Moseley's classic paper on atomic numbers, holmium was assigned an atomic number of 66. Evidently, the holmium preparation he had been given to investigate had been grossly impure, dominated by neighboring (and unplotted) dysprosium. He would have seen x-ray emission lines for both elements, but assumed that the dominant ones belonged to holmium, instead of the dysprosium impurity.

Occurrence and production

Like all other rare earths, holmium is not naturally found as a free element. It does occur combined with other elements in gadolinite (the black part of the specimen illustrated to the right), monazite and other rare-earth minerals. No holmium-dominant mineral has yet been found. The main mining areas are China, United States, Brazil, India, Sri Lanka, and Australia with reserves of holmium estimated as 400,000 tonnes. The annual production of holmium metal is of about 10 tonnes per year.

Holmium makes up 1.4 parts per million of the Earth's crust by mass. This makes it the 56th most abundant element in the Earth's crust. Holmium makes up 1 part per million of the soils, 400 parts per quadrillion of seawater, and almost none of Earth's atmosphere, which is very rare for a lanthanide. It makes up 500 parts per trillion of the universe by mass.

It is commercially extracted by ion exchange from monazite sand (0.05% holmium), but is still difficult to separate from other rare earths. The element has been isolated through the reduction of its anhydrous chloride or fluoride with metallic calcium. Its estimated abundance in the Earth's crust is 1.3 mg/kg. Holmium obeys the Oddo–Harkins rule: as an odd-numbered element, it is less abundant than its immediate even-numbered neighbors, dysprosium and erbium. However, it is the most abundant of the odd-numbered heavy lanthanides. Of the lanthanides, only promethium, thulium, lutetium and terbium are less abundant on Earth. The principal current source are some of the ion-adsorption clays of southern China. Some of these have a rare-earth composition similar to that found in xenotime or gadolinite. Yttrium makes up about 2/3 of the total by mass; holmium is around 1.5%. The original ores themselves are very lean, maybe only 0.1% total lanthanide, but are easily extracted. Holmium is relatively inexpensive for a rare-earth metal with the price about 1000 USD/kg.

Applications

Magnets 

Holmium has the highest magnetic strength of any element, and therefore is used to create the strongest artificially generated magnetic fields, when placed within high-strength magnets as a magnetic pole piece (also called a magnetic flux concentrator). Holmium is also used in the manufacture of some permanent magnets.

Lasers 

Holmium-doped yttrium iron garnet (YIG) and yttrium lithium fluoride (YLF) have applications in solid-state lasers, and Ho-YIG has applications in optical isolators and in microwave equipment (e.g., YIG spheres). Holmium lasers emit at 2.1 micrometres. They are used in medical, dental, and fiber-optical applications. It is also being considered for usage in the enucleation of the prostate.

Spectrometer calibration 

Glass containing holmium oxide and holmium oxide solutions (usually in perchloric acid) have sharp optical absorption peaks in the spectral range 200–900 nm. They are therefore used as a calibration standard for optical spectrophotometers.

The radioactive but long-lived 166m1Ho (see "Isotopes" above) is used in calibration of gamma-ray spectrometers.

Other uses 

Since holmium can absorb nuclear fission-bred neutrons, it is used as a burnable poison to regulate nuclear reactors.

It is used as a colorant for cubic zirconia, providing pink coloring, and for glass, providing yellow-orange coloring.

In March 2017, IBM announced that they had developed a technique to store one bit of data on a single holmium atom set on a bed of magnesium oxide. With sufficient quantum and classical control techniques, Ho could be a good candidate to make quantum computers.

Biological role and precautions

Holmium plays no biological role in humans, but its salts are able to stimulate metabolism. Humans typically consume about a milligram of holmium a year. Plants do not readily take up holmium from the soil. Some vegetables have had their holmium content measured, and it amounted to 100 parts per trillion. Holmium and its soluble salts are slightly toxic if ingested, but insoluble holmium salts are nontoxic. Metallic holmium in dust form presents a fire and explosion hazard. Large amounts of holmium salts can cause severe damage if inhaled, consumed orally, or injected. The biological effects of holmium over a long period of time are not known. Holmium has a low level of acute toxicity.

Prices
The price of 1 kilogram of Holmium Oxide 99.5% (FOB China in RMB/Kg) is given by the Institute of Rare Earths Elements and Strategic Metals as below USD 500 until March 2011; it then rose steeply to just below USD 4,500 by July 2011 and steadily declined to USD 750 by mid-2012. The average price for the six month period of April to September 2022 is given by the Institute as follows: Holmium Oxide - 99.5%min EXW China - 94.34 EUR/kg.

See also
Holmium compounds
 Lanthanide
 Period 6 element
 Rare earth metals

References

Bibliography

Further reading 
 R. J. Callow, The Industrial Chemistry of the Lanthanons, Yttrium, Thorium, and Uranium, Pergamon Press, 1967.

External links

WebElements.com –	 Holmium (also used as a reference)
American Elements – Holmium American Elements (also used as a reference)
 Holmium at The Periodic Table of Videos (University of Nottingham)

 
Chemical elements
Chemical elements with hexagonal close-packed structure
Ferromagnetic materials
Lanthanides
Neutron poisons
Reducing agents